Catherine Zask (born 1961, Paris, France) is a French graphic designer, typographer and artist.

Biography
She graduated from the ESAG (Paris) in 1984. Started her career as an independent designer in 1985.

Since 1985, Zask simultaneously works for commissioned and self initiated projects, using sometimes the letter as a means. She created Alfabetempo in 1993–1994, during her residency at the Villa Medici, French Academy in Rome. This work continues the research she began ten years earlier on letter, tracing and sign. Alfabetempo, Alcibiade, Gribouillis (Doodles), Radiographies de pensées (X-rays of thoughts), Sismozask, Cousu-Zask, The Iris Project, Happy Dots, Splashs… are works she is currently working on, mixing writing, drawings, movies, photos.

She taught at the École de Communication Visuelle (1989–1990), and at the École d'Art de Besançon (1992–1993), gives lectures and participates in juries in France and abroad.

Her work for the University of Franche-Comté was shown at the Centre Pompidou in 1991. Solo exhibitions took place at the Galerie Anatome, Paris in 2004; at the Museum für Gestaltung, Zürich in 2005; at Artazart, Paris, at the Design Centre of the Czech Republic, Brno in 2006, Prague in 2007.

Zask has won several awards, including the Grand Prix at the 20th International Biennial of Graphic Design, Brno, 2002.
She is member of the Alliance Graphique Internationale.

Exhibitions

Solo exhibitions
 2007: "CZ in CZ", Design Centre of the Czech Republic, Prague
 2006: Design Centre of the Czech Republic, Brno
 2006: "Kaléidozask", Artazart, Paris
 2006: "9 saisons d'affiches", L'Hippodrome scène nationale de Douai
 2005: Museum für Gestaltung Zürich – curator Félix Studinka
 2004: "Zask's the Question", Galerie Anatome, Paris
 1991: "L'identité visuelle de l'université de Franche-Comté", École d'art de Besançon
 1991: showcase in bookstore la Hune, Paris
 1991: Salon Exempla'91 – Schrift-Satz-Buch-Druck, Munich
 1991: "La commande publique", six années de création graphique pour l'université de Franche-Comté, CCI, Centre Georges Pompidou, Paris
 1988: Galerie Equinox, Paris

Collective exhibitions
Catherine Zask worldwide participated to many collective exhibitions: 
 Europe: France, Germany, United Kingdom, Switzerland, Finland, Czech Republic, Croatia, Russia
 Japan, China, India, South Korea, Iran, USA

Collections
 Sammlung Grafikdesign, Staatliche Museen zu Berlin, Kunstbibliothek
 Bibliothèque nationale de France, Paris
 Lahti Art Museum, Finland
 Les Silos, Maison du livre et de l'affiche, Chaumont
 Moravian Gallery in Brno, Czech Republic
 L'Addresse Musée de La Poste, Paris
 Musée de la Publicité, Palais du Louvre, Paris
 Museum für Gestaltung, Zürich
 Museum of Modern Art, Toyama, Japan
 PAN Plakatsammlung im Kunstforum Niederrhein, Emmerich, Germany
 Tehran Museum of Contemporary Art, Iran

Awards
 2010: chevalier de l'Ordre des Arts et des Lettres, July 2010
 2006: poster contest winner "Concert Sauvage" set up by Die Neue Sammlung State Museum of Applied Arts and Design, Munich
 2006: Golden Bee Award – 7th Golden Bee biennial, Moscow
 2004: Golden Bee Award – 6th Golden Bee biennial, Moscow
 2003: special jury award at First China International Poster Biennial
 2002: Grand Prix – 20th Brno international graphic design biennial, Czech Republic
 2001: reward from Fiacre for "Radiographies de pensées”
 1997: member of l'AGI (Alliance graphique internationale)
 1996: winner of the Third Crane European Letterhead Competition
 1993–1994: resident at the Villa Medici (Académie de France à Rome)
 1989: Dragon d'or of the ESAG
 1988: Typography Excellence Award at type directors Club, New York

Bibliography
Poster Collection 12 – Catherine Zask, Museum of Design Zurich and Lars Müller Publishers, with essays by Henri Gaudin and Catherine de Smet,

Notes and references

External links

Pixelcreation Online Exhibition, 2003
Linda Sturling Freelance Graphic Designer
Posterpage Online Posters Exhibition, 2003
Poster Collection 12 Lars Müller Publishers, 2005
Catherine Zask: La Lettre Comme Moyen Rencontres Internationales De Lure, 2002
Autumn In Paris: A Visit with Catherine Zask Linda Cooper Bowen, In Communication Art, 2008

1961 births
Living people
French graphic designers
Women graphic designers
French poster artists
French typographers and type designers